Califano v. Yamasaki, 442 U.S. 682 (1979), was a United States Supreme Court case in which the Court decided an issue of Federal statutory hearing rights.

Under section 204(a)(1) of the Social Security Act, the Secretary of the Department of Health, Education, and Welfare  was allowed to make recoupments of erroneous overpayments of old age, survivors' or disability benefits by deducting from future payments. Section 204(b) allowed the Secretary to preclude the recoupment if the disability recipient was without fault and adjustments or recovery would "defeat the purposes" of the Act or "be against equity and good conscience."

Under the Department's procedures, after a recipient was notified of the ex parte determination that an overpayment had been made, the recipient could file a written request either seeking reconsideration of that determination or asking the Secretary to waive recovery in accordance with 204(b). The recoupment would start if the agency's decision on the request went against the recipient, and an oral hearing would be granted only if the recipient continued to object to recoupment.

A number of beneficiaries challenged the Department's procedure under the due process clause of the Fifth Amendment to the US Constitution.

In an opinion written by Justice Blackmun, the court held that because individual rights were at stake, the procedures did not satisfy the requirements of due process.

See also 
 United States v. Florida East Coast Railway Co., 
List of United States Supreme Court cases, volume 442

External links
 

United States Supreme Court cases
United States Supreme Court cases of the Burger Court
United States administrative case law
1979 in United States case law
Social Security lawsuits